Perlucidibaca piscinae is a gram-negative, oxidase-positive and catalase-negative, facultatively aerobic, motile bacterium with a polar flagellum from the genus of Perlucidibaca which was isolated from an eutrophic pond.

References

External links
Type strain of Perlucidibaca piscinae at BacDive -  the Bacterial Diversity Metadatabase

Moraxellaceae
Bacteria described in 2008